Xing Yong (died 223), courtesy name Zi'ang, was a government official of the state of Cao Wei during the Three Kingdoms period of China. He previously served under the warlord Cao Cao in the late Eastern Han dynasty.

Early life
Xing Yong was from Mo County, Hejian Commandery, which is located south of present-day Xiong County, Hebei. In his early years, he was nominated as a xiaolian (civil service candidate) by his home commandery and offered the position of an assistant official under the Minister over the Masses. However, he rejected the offer, changed his name, and moved to Youbeiping Commandery (右北平郡; around present-day Tangshan, Hebei), where he met and befriended Tian Chou and travelled around with him.

Service under Cao Cao
Five years later, around the year 207, the warlord Cao Cao conquered Ji Province (covering much of present-day Hebei and parts of Shandong). When Xing Yong heard about it, he told Tian Chou: "It has been over 20 years since the Yellow Turban Rebellion. The Han Empire is in a state of chaos and the people are displaced from their homes. I heard that Lord Cao upholds law and order. The people are tired of living in a chaotic era and hope that peace will be restored soon. I want to be a pioneer in all this." He then returned to Hejian Commandery. Tian Chou remarked: "Xing Yong is the first person among the common people to come to that realisation."

Xing Yong sought an audience with Cao Cao and volunteered to guide Cao Cao and his army on a campaign against Yuan Shao's sons and their Wuhuan allies at Liucheng (柳城; southwest of present-day Chaoyang, Liaoning). Cao Cao appointed him as an Assistant Officer in Ji Province. At the time, Xing Yong was famous for his virtuous conduct.

Cao Cao subsequently promoted Xing Yong to the position of Chief of Guangzong County (廣宗縣; southeast of present-day Guangzong County, Hebei). Xing Yong resigned later when his superior, the commandery administrator, died. When other officials reported him to Cao Cao (because they saw his resignation as an irresponsible action), Cao Cao said: "Xing Yong had a close relationship with his superior. He wants to show his devout loyalty to his superior. There is no need to fault him for that."

Cao Cao later summoned Xing Yong back to serve as an assistant official under him before appointing him as the Prefect of Tang County (唐縣; northwest of present-day Shunping County, Hebei). During his tenure, Xing Yong promoted agriculture and civil culture among the county residents. Some time later, Cao Cao recalled him to serve in his administrative office before reassigning him to Zuopingyi Commandery (左馮翊; around present-day Weinan, Shaanxi). Xing Yong resigned later due to illness.

Around 214, when Cao Cao was selecting officials to serve in the personal staffs of his sons, he said: "The personal staffs of nobles should be staffed by officials who are as familiar with rules and protocol as Xing Yong." He then appointed Xing Yong as a steward to his fourth son, Cao Zhi, who then held a marquis title. As Xing Yong strictly followed the rules and protocol without exception, Cao Zhi, who was known for his unbridled behaviour, disliked Xing Yong and distanced himself from Xing Yong. Liu Zhen, another member of Cao Zhi's personal staff, wrote to Cao Zhi: "Xing Yong is one of the talents from the north. Since young, he was already known for conducting himself with virtue and morality. He is a true gentleman as he shows humble and polite behaviour, and he thinks more than he speaks. I do not think I am worthy enough to serve you alongside him. However, I have received especially generous treatment from you, while Xing Yong, in contrast, has been shunned and given the cold shoulder. I am worried that people will start criticising you for associating yourself with the non-virtuous and being disrespectful towards the virtuous, and for favouring a servant over your steward. You will be in deep trouble if such criticisms indirectly affect your father's reputation as well. I feel very uneasy when I ponder over this."

Cao Cao later recalled Xing Yong to serve as a military adviser under him before reassigning him to serve in the east bureau of his office. Around the time, Cao Cao had not designated one of his sons as the heir apparent to his vassal kingdom yet. His preferred choice was Cao Zhi; Cao Zhi's associates such as Ding Yi also tried to help Cao Zhi win the succession by praising him in front of Cao Cao. When Cao Cao asked Xing Yong for his opinion, the latter replied: "It is against tradition to choose a younger son over an older son to be one's heir apparent. I hope that Your Highness will reconsider this carefully!" Cao Cao understood what Xing Yong meant, and eventually designated his eldest surviving son, Cao Pi, as his heir apparent. He then appointed Xing Yong as the Junior Tutor to the Crown Prince before promoting him to Grand Tutor later.

Service in Wei
Cao Cao died in March 220 and was succeeded by Cao Pi as the ruler of his vassal kingdom. Later that year, Cao Pi usurped the throne from the figurehead Emperor Xian, ended the Eastern Han dynasty, and established the state of Cao Wei with himself as the new emperor. After his coronation, Cao Pi appointed Xing Yong as a Palace Attendant and Supervisor of the Masters of Writing, and enfeoffed him as a Secondary Marquis. Xing Yong was subsequently promoted to Colonel-Director of Retainers and then Minister of Ceremonies.

Xing Yong died in 223. His son, Xing You, inherited his peerage as a Secondary Marquis.

Descendants
Xing Qiao, a great-grandson of Xing Yong, had the courtesy name Zengbo. He was known for his talent and virtuous conduct. During the Yuankang era (291–299) of the reign of Emperor Hui of the Jin dynasty, Xing Qiao served as a supervisor of the selection bureau of the imperial secretariat alongside Liu Huan, and was promoted to Colonel-Director of Retainers shortly after.

See also
 Lists of people of the Three Kingdoms

References

 Chen, Shou (3rd century). Records of the Three Kingdoms (Sanguozhi).
 
 Pei, Songzhi (5th century). Annotations to Records of the Three Kingdoms (Sanguozhi zhu).
 

Year of birth unknown
223 deaths
Cao Wei politicians
Officials under Cao Cao
Han dynasty politicians from Hebei
Politicians from Baoding
Political office-holders in Hebei
Political office-holders in Shaanxi